Ronche is the name of several hamlets (frazioni) in Italy and may refer to:
Ronche, in Lamon, Belluno province, Veneto
Ronche, in Fontanafredda, Pordenone, Friuli-Venezia Giulia
Ronche (Sacile), Sacile, Pordenone, Friuli-Venezia Giulia